Diabetes insipidus (DI), alternately called arginine vasopressin deficiency (AVP-D) or arginine vasopressin resistance (AVP-R), is a condition characterized by large amounts of dilute urine and increased thirst. The amount of urine produced can be nearly 20 liters per day. Reduction of fluid has little effect on the concentration of the urine. Complications may include dehydration or seizures.

There are four types of DI, each with a different set of causes. Central DI (CDI) is due to a lack of vasopressin (antidiuretic hormone) production. This can be due to injury to the hypothalamus or pituitary gland or genetics. Nephrogenic DI (NDI) occurs when the kidneys do not respond properly to vasopressin. Dipsogenic DI is a result of excessive fluid intake due to damage to the hypothalamic thirst mechanism. It occurs more often in those with certain psychiatric disorders or on certain medications. Gestational DI occurs only during pregnancy. Diagnosis is often based on urine tests, blood tests and the fluid deprivation test. Diabetes insipidus is unrelated to diabetes mellitus and the conditions have a distinct mechanism, though both can result in the production of large amounts of urine.

Treatment involves drinking sufficient fluids to prevent dehydration. Other treatments depend on the type. In central and gestational DI, treatment is with desmopressin. Nephrogenic DI may be treated by addressing the underlying cause or by the use of a thiazide, aspirin or ibuprofen. The number of new cases of diabetes insipidus each year is 3 in 100,000. Central DI usually starts between the ages of 10 and 20 and occurs in males and females equally. Nephrogenic DI can begin at any age. The term "diabetes" is derived from the Greek word meaning siphon.

Signs and symptoms
Excessive urination and extreme thirst and increased fluid intake (especially for cold water and sometimes ice or ice water) are typical for DI. The symptoms of excessive urination and extreme thirst are similar to what is seen in untreated diabetes mellitus, with the distinction that the urine does not contain glucose. Blurred vision is a rarity. Signs of dehydration may also appear in some individuals, since the body cannot conserve much (if any) of the water it takes in.

Extreme urination continues throughout the day and the night. In children, DI can interfere with appetite, eating, weight gain and growth, as well. They may present with fever, vomiting or diarrhea. Adults with untreated DI may remain healthy for decades as long as enough water is consumed to offset the urinary losses. However, there is a continuous risk of dehydration and loss of potassium that may lead to hypokalemia.

Cause
The several forms of diabetes insipidus are:

Central

Central (or Neurogenic) DI has many possible causes. According to the literature, the principal causes of central DI and their oft-cited approximate frequencies are as follows:
 Idiopathic – 30%
 Malignant or benign tumors of the brain or pituitary – 25%
 Cranial surgery – 20%
 Head trauma – 16%

Nephrogenic

Nephrogenic diabetes insipidus is due to the inability of the kidney to respond normally to vasopressin.

Dipsogenic
Dipsogenic DI or primary polydipsia results from excessive intake of fluids as opposed to deficiency of arginine vasopressin. It may be due to a defect or damage to the thirst mechanism, located in the hypothalamus, or due to mental illness. Treatment with desmopressin may lead to water intoxication.

Gestational
Gestational DI occurs only during pregnancy and the postpartum period. During pregnancy, women produce vasopressinase in the placenta, which breaks down antidiuretic hormone (ADH). Gestational DI is thought to occur with excessive production and/or impaired clearance of vasopressinase.

Most cases of gestational DI can be treated with desmopressin (DDAVP), but not vasopressin. In rare cases, however, an abnormality in the thirst mechanism causes gestational DI, and desmopressin should not be used. 

Diabetes insipidus is also associated with some serious diseases of pregnancy, including pre-eclampsia, HELLP syndrome and acute fatty liver of pregnancy. These cause DI by impairing hepatic clearance of circulating vasopressinase.

Pathophysiology
Electrolyte and volume homeostasis is a complex mechanism that balances the body's requirements for blood pressure and the main electrolytes sodium and potassium. In general, electrolyte regulation precedes volume regulation. When the volume is severely depleted, however, the body will retain water at the expense of deranging electrolyte levels.

The regulation of urine production occurs in the hypothalamus, which produces ADH in the supraoptic and paraventricular nuclei. After synthesis, the hormone is transported in neurosecretory granules down the axon of the hypothalamic neuron to the posterior lobe of the pituitary gland, where it is stored for later release. In addition, the hypothalamus regulates the sensation of thirst in the ventromedial nucleus by sensing increases in serum osmolarity and relaying this information to the cortex.

Neurogenic/central DI results from a lack of ADH; occasionally it can present with decreased thirst as regulation of thirst and ADH production occur in close proximity in the hypothalamus. It is encountered as a result of hypoxic encephalopathy, neurosurgery, autoimmunity or cancer, or sometimes without an underlying cause (idiopathic).

The main effector organ for fluid homeostasis is the kidney. ADH acts by increasing water permeability in the collecting ducts and distal convoluted tubules; specifically, it acts on proteins called aquaporins and more specifically aquaporin 2 in the following cascade. When released, ADH binds to V2 G-protein coupled receptors within the distal convoluted tubules, increasing cyclic AMP, which couples with protein kinase A, stimulating translocation of the aquaporin 2 channel stored in the cytoplasm of the distal convoluted tubules and collecting ducts into the apical membrane. These transcribed channels allow water into the collecting duct cells. The increase in permeability allows for reabsorption of water into the bloodstream, thus concentrating the urine.

Nephrogenic DI results from lack of aquaporin channels in the distal collecting duct (decreased surface expression and transcription). It is seen in lithium toxicity, hypercalcemia, hypokalemia, or release of ureteral obstruction. Therefore, a lack of ADH prevents water reabsorption and the osmolarity of the blood increases. With increased osmolarity, the osmoreceptors in the hypothalamus detect this change and stimulate thirst. With increased thirst, the person now experiences a polydipsia and polyuria cycle.

Hereditary forms of diabetes insipidus account for less than 10% of the cases of diabetes insipidus seen in clinical practice.

Diagnosis
To distinguish DI from other causes of excess urination, blood glucose levels, bicarbonate levels, and calcium levels need to be tested. Measurement of blood electrolytes can reveal a high sodium level (hypernatremia as dehydration develops). Urinalysis demonstrates a dilute urine with a low specific gravity. Urine osmolarity and electrolyte levels are typically low.

A fluid deprivation test is another way of distinguishing DI from other causes of excessive urination. If there is no change in fluid loss, giving desmopressin can determine if DI is caused by:
 a defect in ADH production
 a defect in the kidneys' response to ADH

This test measures the changes in body weight, urine output, and urine composition when fluids are withheld to induce dehydration. The body's normal response to dehydration is to conserve water by concentrating the urine. Those with DI continue to urinate large amounts of dilute urine in spite of water deprivation. In primary polydipsia, the urine osmolality should increase and stabilize at above 280 mOsm/kg with fluid restriction, while a stabilization at a lower level indicates diabetes insipidus. Stabilization in this test means, more specifically, when the increase in urine osmolality is less than 30 Osm/kg per hour for at least three hours. Sometimes measuring blood levels of ADH toward the end of this test is also necessary, but is more time-consuming to perform.

To distinguish between the main forms, desmopressin stimulation is also used; desmopressin can be taken by injection, a nasal spray, or a tablet. While taking desmopressin, a person should drink fluids or water only when thirsty and not at other times, as this can lead to sudden fluid accumulation in the central nervous system. If desmopressin reduces urine output and increases urine osmolarity, the hypothalamic production of ADH is deficient, and the kidney responds normally to exogenous vasopressin (desmopressin). If the DI is due to kidney pathology, desmopressin does not change either urine output or osmolarity (since the endogenous vasopressin levels are already high).

Whilst diabetes insipidus usually occurs with polydipsia, it can also rarely occur not only in the absence of polydipsia but in the presence of its opposite, adipsia (or hypodipsia). "Adipsic diabetes insipidus" is recognised as a marked absence of thirst even in response to hyperosmolality. In some cases of adipsic DI, the person may also fail to respond to desmopressin.

If central DI is suspected, testing of other hormones of the pituitary, as well as magnetic resonance imaging, particularly a pituitary MRI, is necessary to discover if a disease process (such as a prolactinoma, or histiocytosis, syphilis, tuberculosis or other tumor or granuloma) is affecting pituitary function. Most people with this form have either experienced past head trauma or have stopped ADH production for an unknown reason.

Treatment
Treatment involves drinking sufficient fluids to prevent dehydration. Other treatments depend on the type. In central and gestational DI treatment is with desmopressin. Nephrogenic DI may be treated by addressing the underlying cause or the use of a thiazide, aspirin, or ibuprofen.

Central
Central DI and gestational DI respond to desmopressin which is given as intranasal or oral tablets. Carbamazepine, an anticonvulsive medication, has also had some success in this type of DI. Also, gestational DI tends to abate on its own four to six weeks following labor, though some women may develop it again in subsequent pregnancies. In dipsogenic DI, desmopressin is not usually an option.

Nephrogenic
Desmopressin will be ineffective in nephrogenic DI which is treated by reversing the underlying cause (if possible) and replacing the free water deficit. A thiazide diuretic, such as chlorthalidone or hydrochlorothiazide, can be used to create mild hypovolemia which encourages salt and water uptake in proximal tubule and thus improve nephrogenic diabetes insipidus. Amiloride has additional benefit of blocking Na uptake. Thiazide diuretics are sometimes combined with amiloride to prevent hypokalemia caused by the thiazides. It seems paradoxical to treat an extreme diuresis with a diuretic, and the exact mechanism of action is unknown but the thiazide diuretics will decrease distal convoluted tubule reabsorption of sodium and water, thereby causing diuresis. This decreases plasma volume, thus lowering the glomerular filtration rate and enhancing the absorption of sodium and water in the proximal nephron. Less fluid reaches the distal nephron, so overall fluid conservation is obtained.

Lithium-induced nephrogenic DI may be effectively managed with the administration of amiloride, a potassium-sparing diuretic often used in conjunction with thiazide or loop diuretics. Clinicians have been aware of lithium toxicity for many years, and traditionally have administered thiazide diuretics for lithium-induced polyuria and nephrogenic diabetes insipidus. However, amiloride has recently been shown to be a successful treatment for this condition.

Etymology 
Ancient Greek physician Aretaeus of Cappadocia (fl. in the first century CE) used that word, with the intended meaning "excessive discharge of urine", as the name for the disease. The word "diabetes" is first recorded in English, in the form "diabete", in a medical text written around 1425.

"Insipidus" comes from Latin language  (tasteless), from Latin: in- "not" +  "tasty" from sapere "have a taste"—the full meaning is "lacking flavor or zest; not tasty". Application of this name to DI arose from the fact that diabetes insipidus does not cause glycosuria (excretion of glucose into the urine).

In a large survey conducted amongst patients with central diabetes insipidus, the majority were in favor of changing the disease's name to "vasopressin deficiency" to avoid confusion with diabetes mellitus.

References

External links 

 

Endocrine diseases
Nephrology
Rare diseases
Thirst
Wikipedia medicine articles ready to translate
Wikipedia neurology articles ready to translate